In Greek mythology, Triopas or Triops (gen.: Τρίοπος) was the name of several characters whose relations are unclear.

Triopas, king of Argos and son of Phorbas. His daughter was Messene.
 Triopas, king of Thessaly, and son of Poseidon and princess Canace, daughter of King Aeolus of Aeolia. He was the brother of Aloeus, Epopeus, Hopleus and Nireus. Triopas was the husband of Myrmidon's daughter Hiscilla, by whom he became the father of Iphimedeia, Phorbas and Erysichthon. He destroyed a temple of Demeter in order to obtain materials for roofing his own house, and was punished by insatiable hunger as well as being plagued by a snake which inflicted illness on him. Eventually Demeter placed him and the snake among the stars as the constellation Ophiuchus to remind others of his crime and punishment. A city in Caria was named Triopion after him.
 Triopas, one of the Heliadae, sons of Helios and Rhodos and grandson of Poseidon. Triopas, along with his brothers, Macar, Actis and Candalus, were jealous of a fifth brother, Tenages's, skill at science, and killed him. When their crime was discovered, Triopas escaped to Caria and seized a promontory which received his name (the Triopian Promontory). Later, he founded the city of Knidos. There was a statue of him and his horse at Delphi, an offering by the people of Knidos.
The name's popular etymology is "he who has three eyes" (from τρι- "three" + -ωπ- "see") but the ending -ωψ, -οπος suggests a Pre-Greek origin.

Notes

References 
Apollodorus, The Library with an English Translation by Sir James George Frazer, F.B.A., F.R.S. in 2 Volumes, Cambridge, MA, Harvard University Press; London, William Heinemann Ltd. 1921. ISBN 0-674-99135-4. Online version at the Perseus Digital Library. Greek text available from the same website.
Diodorus Siculus, The Library of History translated by Charles Henry Oldfather. Twelve volumes. Loeb Classical Library. Cambridge, Massachusetts: Harvard University Press; London: William Heinemann, Ltd. 1989. Vol. 3. Books 4.59–8. Online version at Bill Thayer's Web Site
 Diodorus Siculus, Bibliotheca Historica. Vol 1-2. Immanel Bekker. Ludwig Dindorf. Friedrich Vogel. in aedibus B. G. Teubneri. Leipzig. 1888–1890. Greek text available at the Perseus Digital Library.
Gaius Julius Hyginus, Astronomica from The Myths of Hyginus translated and edited by Mary Grant. University of Kansas Publications in Humanistic Studies. Online version at the Topos Text Project.
Gaius Julius Hyginus, Fabulae from The Myths of Hyginus translated and edited by Mary Grant. University of Kansas Publications in Humanistic Studies. Online version at the Topos Text Project.
 Pausanias, Description of Greece with an English Translation by W.H.S. Jones, Litt.D., and H.A. Ormerod, M.A., in 4 Volumes. Cambridge, MA, Harvard University Press; London, William Heinemann Ltd. 1918. . Online version at the Perseus Digital Library
Pausanias, Graeciae Descriptio. 3 vols. Leipzig, Teubner. 1903.  Greek text available at the Perseus Digital Library.
 Publius Ovidius Naso, Metamorphoses translated by Brookes More (1859-1942). Boston, Cornhill Publishing Co. 1922. Online version at the Perseus Digital Library.
 Publius Ovidius Naso, Metamorphoses. Hugo Magnus. Gotha (Germany). Friedr. Andr. Perthes. 1892. Latin text available at the Perseus Digital Library.
 Stephanus of Byzantium, Stephani Byzantii Ethnicorum quae supersunt, edited by August Meineike (1790-1870), published 1849. A few entries from this important ancient handbook of place names have been translated by Brady Kiesling. Online version at the Topos Text Project.

Further reading 
 Arthur Bernard Cook. "Zeus, Jupiter, and the Oak". The Classical Review 18:1:75-89 (February 1904).

Aeolides
Children of Poseidon
Children of Helios
Demigods in classical mythology
Rhodian characters in Greek mythology
Thessalian characters in Greek mythology
Mythology of Argos
Rhodian mythology
Thessalian mythology
Deeds of Demeter

de:Triopas